Emmanuel Alexis Cristori (born 5 May 1986 in Córdoba, Argentina) is an Argentine former professional footballer who played as a forward.

Clubs
 Alhaurino 2005–2006
 Poli Ejido B 2006–2007
 Lucena 2007 (loan)
 Real Murcia B 2007–2008
 Vera 2008–2009
 Ionikos 2009–2010
 Alhaurino 2010
 La Paz 2011
 Persiba Bantul 2011–2012
 Chacarita Juniors 2013–2014
 Lincoln Red Imps 2015

External links
 

1986 births
Living people
Argentine footballers
Association football forwards
Ionikos F.C. players
La Paz F.C. players
Lucena CF players
Real Murcia Imperial players
Argentine expatriate footballers
Argentine expatriate sportspeople in Spain
Expatriate footballers in Spain
Argentine expatriate sportspeople in Greece
Expatriate footballers in Greece
Argentine expatriate sportspeople in Bolivia
Expatriate footballers in Bolivia
Argentine expatriate sportspeople in Indonesia
Expatriate footballers in Indonesia
Argentine expatriate sportspeople in Gibraltar
Expatriate footballers in Gibraltar
Footballers from Córdoba, Argentina
21st-century Argentine people